Floyd Favors (born December 3, 1963 in Washington, D.C.) is a retired boxer from the United States. He is best known for winning the amateur world title in the men's bantamweight (– 54 kg) division in 1982.

Favors made his debut as a professional on 1985-03-13, defeating Godfrey Johnson. He ended his career after 20 bouts, having won 14 fights (KO 4) and lost five. His last bout was on 1992-06-26, when he was defeated by Leavander Johnson.

References

External links
 

1963 births
Living people
Boxers from Washington, D.C.
Bantamweight boxers
Boxers at the 1983 Pan American Games
American male boxers
AIBA World Boxing Championships medalists
Pan American Games medalists in boxing
Pan American Games bronze medalists for the United States
Medalists at the 1983 Pan American Games